The Cochrane station is a Mass Rapid Transit (MRT) underground station in Kuala Lumpur, Malaysia, on the MRT Kajang Line. The station was opened on 17 July 2017 as part of the second phase operations of the line.

The station is located in the Cheras area of Kuala Lumpur adjacent to Cochrane Road, Peel Road and Shelley Road. It is also well known for being located near two large shopping complexes - MyTown Shopping Centre (housing Malaysia's second IKEA store) and Sunway Velocity Mall, with the former being connected to the station via an underground pedestrian linkway and the latter via an elevated pedestrian bridge.

The underground station is located in Cheras along Cochrane Road, Peel Road and Shelley Road. The location is part of an area previously occupied by quarters housing government servants.

Station Layout

Station Layout
The station has four underground levels, with three accessible to the public, namely the Upper Concourse Level, Lower Concourse Level and the Platform Level. One level housing the plant rooms is located between the Upper and Lower Concourse Levels, and is not accessible by the public. The ground level above the station is an open plaza with the station's two entrance buildings cum ventilation shafts as well as a skylight opening with a distinctive glass pyramid.

The theme chosen for the interior design of the station was "Urban Living" in recognition of the role the station will play in the redevelopment of the area.

The following is the station layout of the station:

Exits and entrances 
The station has two entrances. Entrance A is located at Cochrane Road, and Entrance B is located at Shelley Road. There is also an entrance at the upper concourse level in between two entrances which is under the glass pyramid which links to MyTown Shopping Centre and IKEA Cheras. There is a pedestrian overhead bridge which leads to Sunway Velocity Mall is accessible via Entrance B. The feeder bus serves at the feeder bus hub located at Entrance A.

History
The Cochrane MRT station is named after Cochrane Road which in turn is named after C.W.H. Cochrane (1876 - 1932), the 17th British Resident of Perak and the Chief Secretary to the Government of the Federated Malay States from 1929 to 1930.

The station is partly located on the site of the former Cochrane Road government quarters. The quarters were demolished in 2010 and the area was earmarked for redevelopment. The MRT station was to become one of the catalysts for this redevelopment process and in recognition of this role, the theme for the interior design of the station that was chosen was "Urban Living".

Bus Services

MRT Feeder Bus Services
With the opening of the MRT Kajang Line, feeder buses also began operating linking the station with several housing and commercial areas around Bandar Tun Razak, Hospital Canselor Tuanku Muhriz UKM (HCTM), Bandar Sri Permaisuri, Taman Midah, Taman Shamelin Perkasa and Pandan Perdana. The feeder buses operate from the station's feeder bus hub at Entrance A (Opposite to MyTown Shopping Centre).

The same feeder bus lines also serves the Maluri station but only acts as a pass-by only.

Other Bus Services 
The MRT Cochrane station also provides accessibility for some other bus services. The Go KL City Bus  is another bus route terminate in the station, provided by Kuala Lumpur City Hall

Gallery

Station

MyTown linkway

Sunway Velocity linkway

See also
 Mutiara Damansara MRT station, on the same line, connected to another IKEA store
MRT Sungai Buloh-Kajang Line
Cochrane Road

References

External links
 Cochrane Station MRT Station | mrt.com.my
 Klang Valley Mass Rapid Transit

Rapid transit stations in Kuala Lumpur
Sungai Buloh-Kajang Line
Railway stations opened in 2017